AOGM may refer to:
Association of Obstetricians and Gynaecologists of Malawi
Association of Obstetrics & Gynecology of Macau
Assemblies of God Movement